Antonio María Valencia (10 November 1902 – 22 July 1952) was a Colombian composer and pianist, one of his country’s most important classical musicians in the first half of the twentieth century.

He composed in several genres.  Among his most important cultural achievements was to promote the creation of the first conservatory in the southwest region of Colombia in the city of Cali. This conservatory is currently part of the Instituto Departamental de Bellas Artes.

Biography
Antonio Maria Valencia was born in Cali. He received his first musical lessons from his father, Julio Valencia, and continued his pianistic studies with Honorio Alarcón at the Bogotá Conservatory. Thanks to a scholarship he traveled in 1923 to France in order to study piano and composition at the Schola Cantorum with Paul Braud and Vincent d'Indy.
In 1929 he returned to Colombia to teach at the conservatory, which had become part of the National University in Bogotá. After resigning this position in 1931 he was put in charge of the recently founded conservatory of Cali (1933). In this institution he worked intensively as a teacher as well as choral and orchestra conductor.
The nationalistic style of his compositions became a model for his generation in Colombia.  He composed piano, chamber and choral pieces, using folk melodies and rhythms with impressionist harmonies.

References

 A cultural history of Latin America: literature, music, and the visual arts in the 19th and 20th century by Leslie Bethell
 Choral Music in the Twentieth Century By Nick Strimple

External links
 Instituto Departamental de Bellas Artes
 Compositores Colombianos (Spanish; contains a biography and a list of his works).
 Biographical Documentary 'Antonio María Valencia: música en cámara' documentary.

Schola Cantorum de Paris alumni
Colombian composers
Male classical composers
20th-century classical composers
1902 births
1952 deaths
Colombian pianists
Male pianists
20th-century pianists
20th-century male musicians